Tahia Kazem (1 March 1920 – 25 March 1992) better known as Tahia Abdel Nasser was the First Lady of Egypt from 23 June 1956 to 28 September 1970. She married future President Gamal Abdel Nasser in 1944. The couple had five children, two girls and three boys.

Early life
Kazem was born in Egypt to an Iranian father and an Egyptian mother.  Nasser received the approval of her father before their marriage in 1944.

Honour

Foreign honours
 
 Grand Cross of the Order of the White Rose of Finland (1967)
 :
 Honorary Recipient of the Order of the Crown of the Realm (1965)

References

1920 births
1992 deaths
First ladies of Egypt
Egyptian people of Iranian descent
20th-century Egyptian women
Abdel Nasser family